Minority Report is an American science fiction crime drama television series that aired on Fox from September 21 to November 30, 2015. It was developed by Max Borenstein and is a sequel adaptation of the 2002 film of the same name based on the 1956 science fiction short story "The Minority Report" by Philip K. Dick. It was produced by Amblin Television, Paramount Television (whose film studio owns the film via the pre-2005 DreamWorks library), and 20th Century Fox Television (whose film studio co-produced the film). It is the first Steven Spielberg–directed film to be adapted for television. On October 9, 2015, Fox announced that the series order was cut from 13 episodes to 10. Fox cancelled the series on May 13, 2016.

Synopsis 
In 2065 Washington, D.C., Dash (Sands), a Precog, has the ability to predict crimes. The Precrime Unit was dismantled in 2054, forcing law enforcement to rely on newer methods to fight crime. Before it was dismantled, Dash, his twin brother Arthur (Zano), and their foster sister Agatha (Regan) were part of the program that gave them their unique gifts. Now, Dash is using his ability to assist Detective Lara Vega (Good) in preventing crimes, and at the same time trying to keep his gift from being revealed, as there are those who want to obtain the Precogs at any cost, and use their abilities once more.

Opening Introduction (narrated by Meagan Good): 

Opening Introduction (starting from episode 7) (narrated by Stark Sands):

Cast

Main 
 Stark Sands as Dash Parker (né Arkadin), a precog who can see the murders of others before they occur, who seeks ways to stop these preventable deaths. During his precognitive visions Dash sees the fractions of the murders, the horror, as described by Wally with the victim and the murder.
 Meagan Good as Lara Vega, a detective for the Metropolitan Police Department of the District of Columbia who Dash co-ops into assisting him on his mission to save would-be murder victims before their killers can kill them.
 Nick Zano as Arthur Watson (né Arkadin), Dash's fraternal twin brother; an executor, estate planner and finance manager. He reluctantly helps out Dash and Vega. While easier to endure than his brother's or Agatha's visions, Arthur's precognitive visions act more as an antenna, pulling in names, facts, and information about the murdered person.
 Daniel London as Norbert "Wally" Wallace, Dash, Arthur and Agatha's primary caretaker during their eight years in the milk bath. Bonded with the three, Wally joins forces with Dash and Lara and helps "map" Dash's visions for better analyzing of the murders.
 Laura Regan as Agatha Lively, a precog who acts as an older sister, protector, and sounding board for Arthur and Dash. Agatha's visions allow her to "become the person" whose murder she is predicting. Experiencing an empathic bond with the person in her visions, Agatha's visions are the most traumatizing as she experiences the death itself.
 Li Jun Li as Akeela, a crime scene tech at Metro Police Department and Lara's best friend, she later joins Lara and Dash on their mission as their tech and information support.
 Wilmer Valderrama as Will Blake, a by-the-books, professional, ambitious, and competitive police lieutenant. Previously Lara's partner, he is now her boss.

Recurring 
 Tina Lifford as Lilly Vega, Lara's mother
 Zhane Hall as Rico Vega, Lara's much younger brother
 Jennifer Cheon as Andromeda, Arthur's business partner and bodyguard
 Reed Diamond as Henry Blomfeld
 Christopher Heyerdahl as Lionel Gray

Production 
On September 9, 2014, it was announced that Fox had ordered a pilot for a follow-up television series to the movie. Max Borenstein wrote the script and served as executive producer alongside Steven Spielberg, Justin Falvey and Darryl Frank. Set 11 years after the movie, the series focuses on a male Precog who teams up with a female detective to find a purpose to his gift.

On February 13, 2015, Daniel London and Li Jun Li joined the cast. On February 24, 2015, Laura Regan was cast as Agatha Lively. In March 2015, Stark Sands and Meagan Good landed the lead roles with Sands playing Dash, one of the two male Precogs, and Good playing Lara Vega, a detective haunted by her past who will work with Dash to help him find a purpose for his gift. Li Jun Li plays Akeela, a crime scene technician; Daniel London reprises his role as Wally the Caretaker from the original 2002 film; and Wilmer Valderrama plays a police detective. The show was picked up to series by Fox on May 8, 2015. On July 1, 2015, it was reported that Nick Zano was cast to play Arthur, Dash's fraternal twin brother. Originally, Sands was going to play dual roles of both brothers (as identical twins).

On October 9, 2015, Fox cut the series order from 13 episodes to 10.

Episodes

Broadcast 
In Canada, the series was simulcast with the American broadcast, airing on Global, and the Canadian premiere had 637,000 viewers. In Australia, the series was broadcast in 2016 on One, part of the Ten network.

Reception

Critical response 
The review aggregator website Rotten Tomatoes reports a 29% approval rating and an average rating of 5.4/10 based on 58 reviews. The website's consensus reads, "Lacking either the action or the imagination of its big-screen predecessor, Minority Report is a pedestrian spinoff that fails to capture the vision of the film." On Metacritic, the series has a score of 51 out of 100 based on 31 reviews, indicating "mixed or average reviews".

Ratings

See also 
 2015 in science fiction

References

External links 
 
 
 

Cyberpunk television series
2010s American crime drama television series
2010s American science fiction television series
2015 American television series debuts
2015 American television series endings
American action television series
English-language television shows
Fox Broadcasting Company original programming
Minority Report (film)
Live action television shows based on films
Television series based on adaptations
Television series based on short fiction
Television shows based on works by Philip K. Dick
Television series by Amblin Entertainment
Television series by Paramount Television
Television series by 20th Century Fox Television
Television shows filmed in Vancouver
Television series set in the 2060s
Television shows set in Washington, D.C.